Kerry Michelle Armstrong (born 12 September 1958) is an Australian actress and author. She is one of only two actresses to win two Australian Film Institute Awards in the same year, winning Best Actress in a Leading Role for Lantana and Best Actress in a Leading Role in a Television Drama for SeaChange in 2001.

After early television roles in Australia including Prisoner (1979) and Skyways (1980), Armstrong moved to the United States in 1981, where she played Ophelia in Hamlet and Isabella in Measure for Measure at the Arena Stage in Washington, D.C., and had a role in the soap opera Dynasty (1985–86). She returned to Australia in 1987. Her other television roles include MDA (2002–03) and Bed of Roses (2008–11).

Career

Early years
Armstrong appeared in both acting and presenting roles on Australian television in the 1970s and early 1980. One of her first acting roles was on television series Marion, released in March 1974. She appeared as a GTV-9 weather girl, and then in a dramatic acting role, appearing as Lynn 'Wonky' Warner, an original character in Network Ten women's prison drama Prisoner. Initially planned to last 16 episodes, the series was continued and Armstrong appeared in the first 44 episodes. She then switched to another ongoing role in drama series Skyways for 49 episodes. In 1981 she co-hosted the Network Ten series Together Tonight with Greg Evans.

In 1981 Armstrong married rock band Australian Crawl's rhythm guitarist Brad Robinson. Armstrong and Robinson co-wrote "Easy on Your Own", a track on Australian Crawl's second album Sirocco and B-side to the single "Errol".

United States and Dynasty
Armstrong moved to the United States in 1981, where she studied under Herbert Berghof and Uta Hagen at the HB Studio in New York City on an acting scholarship. With the studio's Playwrights Foundation, she played Juliet in Shakespeare's Romeo and Juliet, Ophelia in Hamlet, and Isabella in Measure for Measure at the Arena Stage in Washington, DC. In order to obtain residency, Armstrong and Robinson agreed she would have to marry a US citizen, so they separated and she married her friend Alexander Bernstein. Armstrong only had a professional arrangement with Bernstein, but her long distance from Robinson dissolved their relationship. In the US, she starred as Christine in Tom Stoppard's Dalliance at the Long Wharf Theatre in New Haven, Connecticut, had an ongoing role in daytime serial One Life to Live, and became part of The Actors' Gang along with John Cusack and Tim Robbins. After working in the group's plays, Armstrong appeared in seven episodes of Dynasty as Elena, Duchess of Branagh. Robbins and Armstrong became romantically involved. Cusack, Robbins and Armstrong auditioned for Saturday Night Live but only Armstrong was offered a part, which she declined. She also guest starred in the 1984 Murder, She Wrote episode "Death Takes a Curtain Call".

Australian return
In 1987, Armstrong returned to Australia upon the death of her grandmother. In the early 1990s, she resumed acting in Australian television series, including Police Rescue, Ocean Girl, Come In Spinner, All Together Now and Halfway Across the Galaxy and Turn Left. In 1991 Armstrong was nominated for an AFI award for Best Actress for her role in the film Hunting which was released by Paramount in the U.S.

In 1998, Armstrong was offered the role of Heather Jelly in the television series SeaChange, the ever-devoted but long-suffering wife of corrupt local mayor Bob (John Howard). The role won her critical acclaim and garnered several awards. When SeaChange ended in 2000, Armstrong continued on with her theatre work and also appeared in Lantana, the award-winning Ray Lawrence film also starring Anthony LaPaglia, Barbara Hershey, Geoffrey Rush, Glenn Robbins and Vince Colosimo.

Armstrong won the Inside Film (IF) Award, Film Critics Circle of Australia Award and the AFI Award for her Lantana performance. In the same year she won another AFI award, for the final season of SeaChange, making her the second actress to win two AFI awards in one year. The first had been Sacha Horler for her 1998 Lead Role in Praise and 1999 Supporting Role in Soft Fruit awarded in 1999.

In 2002, Armstrong joined the cast of medico-legal drama MDA on ABC alongside Jason Donovan and Shane Bourne. However, she left the series at the end of its second season. In the series her character, Dr Ella Davis, left the firm that was the focus of the show. After MDA, Armstrong appeared in films One Perfect Day, Oyster Farmer, Virus, Car Pool and Razzle Dazzle. On 10 May 2008 ABC-TV started screening a six-part series Bed of Roses with Armstrong in the lead role as Louisa Atherton. In 2008 she appeared in the film Reservations. In 2010, Bed of Roses returned for a second season on the ABC followed by a third and final season in 2011. In the same year she starred in the short film, The Forgotten Men, alongside Jack Thompson and Gyton Grantley. 2016 sees Armstrong return to Australian screens in the series The Wrong Girl for Network Ten.

Author
Armstrong wrote a self-help book, The Circles, released on 1 November 2003. She described the book as a practical exercise in empowering people. In May 2008, Armstrong told the Herald Sun the book's US publisher, Beyond Words, had received a call from a large book club in the US which wanted 21,000 copies of the book.

Her second book, Fool on the Hill, released in March 2006, is about the nature of personality. A travel guide, Newcomer's Handbook for New York City was co-edited with Belden Merims in 1996.

Public profile
Armstrong has worked with several charitable organisations including Childwise, Big hART, and Cure for Life Foundation which sponsors research into brain tumour treatments. In 2006, she represented Cure for Life in season five of Dancing with the Stars. Armstrong and dance partner, Christopher Ryan, were the third couple eliminated from the show.

Armstrong has publicly opposed the War in Iraq, and in protest, sat on the steps of the Victorian Parliament in a purple bra to draw attention to her cause.

In October 2008 Armstrong appeared as the face of a "myth-busting" advertising campaign for Coca-Cola Amatil, created by the agency Singleton Ogilvy & Mather. Titled "Kerry Armstrong on Motherhood and Myth Busting", the print advertisement purported to correct "myths and conjecture" about Coca-Cola drink products. Claiming her three boys called her "Mum, the myth buster", Armstrong rejected suggestions that Coca-Cola "rots your teeth", "makes you fat" and is "packed with caffeine".

In April 2009, the Australian Competition & Consumer Commissioner ruled that the Coca-Cola advertisements in which Armstrong appeared were misleading. The ACCC's chairman, Graeme Samuel, said, "Coke's messages were totally unacceptable, creating an impression which is likely to mislead that Coca-Cola cannot contribute to weight gain, obesity and tooth decay".

Personal life
Armstrong was born in Melbourne in 1958. In 1981, Armstrong was briefly married to Australian Crawl's rhythm guitarist Brad Robinson. Under the advice of her US agent and with Robinson's consent, she married friend, Alexander Bernstein, in order to resolve visa issues and allow her to work in the United States. In 1990, when their son was three months old, she married writer-producer Mac Gudgeon. The marriage to Gudgeon ended and in 1996 she married builder Mark Croft and they have twin sons. Armstrong and Croft separated in 2001. As of 2008, she lived with her three sons in the Yarra Valley.

Awards 
 1991 – Nominated – Australian Film Institute (AFI) Award – Best Actress – Hunting
 2000 – Nominated – Logie Award – Outstanding Actress in TV Series – SeaChange
 2001 – Winner – Logie Award – Outstanding Actress in TV Series – SeaChange
 2001 – Winner – AFI Award – Best Actress (Television) – SeaChange
 2001 – Winner – IF Award – Best Actress – Lantana (shared with co-stars Barbara Hershey, Leah Purcell, Rachael Blake and Daniela Farinacci)
 2001 – Winner – AFI Award – Best Actress – Lantana
 2001 – Winner – Film Critics Circle of Australia Award – Best Actress – Lantana
 2002 – Nominated – AFI Award – Best Actress (Television) – MDA

Filmography

Film

Television

References

External links
 
 Profile, Marquee Management

1958 births
Living people
Actresses from Melbourne
Australian film actresses
Australian soap opera actresses
Best Actress AACTA Award winners
Logie Award winners
I'm a Celebrity...Get Me Out of Here! (Australian TV series) participants
20th-century Australian actresses
21st-century Australian actresses